Phyllobotryon spatulatum is a large shrub or small tree native to tropical West Africa.

Description
It is especially noted for its flowers, which grow in several evenly-spaced clusters along the midrib of the leaves. It is believed that an inflorescence has become fused to the midrib, as in the lindens (Tilia spp). The  small red flowers are trimerous, with 3 sepals, 3 petals a pistil with 3 stigmata and about thirty stamens.

References

Salicaceae